is a futuristic role-playing video game for the Sega Mega Drive.

It was released only for Japan on June 22, 1991 and had a US release as Star Odyssey planned and advertised but it was cancelled at the time. North American publisher Super Fighter Team acquired the official rights to publish an English version of the game with alterations to the translation and the programming, based on an as-for-yet unreleased prototype of the US version, and released it exactly twenty years after the game's original release as Star Odyssey.

Super Fighter Team
This game was officially released worldwide, in English, on June 22, 2011 under the name Star Odyssey. It was produced and published by North American company Super Fighter Team in cooperation with Starfish-SD Inc.

On August 6, 2013, the game was released for Windows and Mac OS X, in the form of a compilation package of three Super Fighter Team RPGs, the other two being Beggar Prince and Legend of Wukong.

Reception
Weekly Famitsu scored the game a 23 out of 40. Famitsu №132, 1990

References

1991 video games
Hot B games
MacOS games
Role-playing video games
Science fiction video games
Sega Genesis games
Single-player video games
Super Fighter Team games
Video games developed in Japan
Video games scored by Noriyuki Iwadare
Windows games